Roberto Agostino Meloni (born 6 December 1977 in Ardara, Sardinia, Italy), is an Italian singer and television presenter currently residing in Latvia.

At the  contest, he announced the points from the Latvian jury.

References

1977 births
Living people
Eurovision Song Contest entrants for Latvia
Eurovision Song Contest entrants of 2007
Eurovision Song Contest entrants of 2008
People from the Province of Sassari
Italian expatriates in Latvia